Mutatoderma is a genus of fungi in the family Corticiaceae. The widespread genus contains four species.

References

External links

Corticiales
Agaricomycetes genera